WWLK (900 AM) was a radio station licensed to serve Eddyville, Kentucky, United States. The station was owned by Tilent, Inc.

History
The station went on the air as WEAK on 1980-09-15. On 1986-03-14, the station changed its call sign to WWLK. On April 19, 2012, the station's license was cancelled and its callsign deleted by the Federal Communications Commission.

References

WLK
Radio stations disestablished in 2012
Defunct radio stations in the United States
2012 disestablishments in Kentucky
Radio stations established in 1980
1980 establishments in Kentucky
WLK